Camellia Bowl can refer to one of three college football bowl games:
 Camellia Bowl (1948), played in Lafayette, Louisiana in 1948
 Camellia Bowl (1961–80), played in Sacramento, California from 1961 to 1975 and again in 1980 in the NCAA College Division
 Camellia Bowl (2014–present), played in Montgomery, Alabama beginning in 2014